Aayta Ej Jabal, is a village in Nabatiye Governorate, in the Bint Jbeil District of southern Lebanon, about  from Beirut. The village is situated in the southern outskirts of the town of Tebnine, in the heart of the Lebanese Shia Muslim community of Jabal Amel.

History

In the 1596  Ottoman tax records, the village, named Ayta al-Gajar,  was located in the Ottoman nahiya (subdistrict) of  Tibnin  under the Liwa of Safad, with a population of 12 households and 3 bachelors, all Muslim. The villagers paid a fixed tax-rate of 25% on  agricultural products, such as wheat (2,600 akçe), barley (1,400 akçe),  olive trees (500 akçe), goats and beehives (400 akçe), in addition to "occasional revenues" (137 akçe) and a press for olive oil or grape syrup (12 akçe); a total of 5,049 akçe. Part of the revenue went to a waqf.Note that Rhode, 1979, p. 6  writes that  the register that  Hütteroth and  Abdulfattah  studied was not from 1595/6, but from 1548/9

In 1856 it was named Aithat et Tut on Kiepert's map of Palestine/Lebanon published that year, while in 1875, Victor Guérin passed by and noted: “to my left, beyond a wadi, [is] the village of A'ïtha, on a high hill; it does not look very considerable and is inhabited by Metualis." 

In 1881, the Palestine Exploration Fund's Survey of Western Palestine (SWP)  described the village (which it called '''Aita ez Zut): "A village, built of stone, containing about fifty Metawileh, situated on a hill-top, with figs, olives, and arable land around. There are two cisterns in the village."

The current Bint Jbeil province was created in 1922 by French colonials.

Notable people from Ayta al-Jabal
 Youssef Mohamad, footballer

References

Bibliography

  

 

External links
 Aita ez Zut'' on the Palestine Exploration Fund Map of 1878, Map 2:  IAA, Wikimedia commons
Aayta Ej Jabal, Localiban

Populated places in Bint Jbeil District
Shia Muslim communities in Lebanon